Michael "Zico" Zeyer (born 9 June 1968) is a German former professional footballer who played as a midfielder. He is the twin brother of Andreas Zeyer.

Honours 
 Bundesliga runner-up: 1994
 DFB-Pokal finalist: 1998

External links 
 

1968 births
Living people
People from Neresheim
Sportspeople from Stuttgart (region)
German footballers
Footballers from Baden-Württemberg
Association football midfielders
Bundesliga players
2. Bundesliga players
SSV Ulm 1846 players
SC Freiburg players
1. FC Kaiserslautern players
SV Waldhof Mannheim players
MSV Duisburg players
VfB Stuttgart players
Fortuna Düsseldorf players
Grindavík men's football players
1. FC Heidenheim players
German expatriate footballers
German expatriate sportspeople in Iceland
Expatriate footballers in Iceland
German twins
Twin sportspeople
West German footballers